The Southern California Public Power Authority (SCPPA) is a joint powers authority, or a collective of 10 municipal utilities and one irrigation district in Southern California, United States.

Description
SCPPA was created in 1980 to help finance the acquisition of generation and transmission resources for its members. The SCPPA is composed of the municipal utilities of the cities of Anaheim, Azusa, Banning, Burbank, Cerritos, Colton, Glendale, Los Angeles, Pasadena, Riverside and Vernon, and the Imperial Irrigation District (Member Agencies). In 2016, SCPPA was the 14th largest public power system in the United States by net generation.

See also

 List of United States electric companies

References

Energy in California
Municipal electric utilities of the United States
Companies based in Los Angeles County, California
Southern California